Owen Pickard is a football striker with football league experience at Plymouth Argyle and Hereford United. He is currently the manager of Barnstaple Town. He kept them in the Toolstation Western League in the 09/10 season with a 4–0 win over Melkshan Town FC. The starting line up was Lloyd Irish, Michael Broome, Jamie Frickleton, Steve Shore, Paul Quinn, Eugenio Da Veiga, Andrew Rogers, Shane Tolley, Marcus Mahoney, Ryan Turner, Stan Paxton.

References

External links 
http://www.neilbrown.newcastlefans.com/player3/owenpickard.html
http://www.soccerbase.com/teams2.sd?teamid=286

1969 births
Living people
Sportspeople from Barnstaple
English footballers
Association football forwards
English Football League players
Plymouth Argyle F.C. players
Hereford United F.C. players
Dorchester Town F.C. players
Bideford A.F.C. players
Yeovil Town F.C. players
English football managers
Barnstaple Town F.C. managers